The Tainan Art Museum (TAM) is an art museum in West Central District, Tainan, Taiwan.

History

Planning for the museum began in 2010. The museum was opened to the public on 27 January 2019 with some  exhibitions opened in October 2018.

Architecture
The museum consists of two main buildings. The museum building 1 was constructed with ochre yellow tiles in Art Deco architecture style. It spans over an area of 1,024 m2. It was designed by Sutejiro Umezawa. The building was constructed  in 1930 originally as the Tainan Police Department. It is the earliest existing police station building in Taiwan. After the handover of Taiwan from Japan to the Republic of China in 1945, it was renamed to Tainan City Police Department. The police department moved out of the building in 2011.

The museum houses multipurpose theater, children's art center, artist exclusive gallery, collection, restoration and an art research center, the first of its kind in Taiwan.

The museum building 1 consists of 16 galleries and the museum building 2 consists of 17 galleries. The museum building 2 spans over an area of 2,960 m2. It was designed by Shi Zhao Yong and Shigeru Ban. The building was designed with the shape of Delonix regia.

Transportation
The museum is accessible within walking distance southwest of Tainan Station of Taiwan Railways.

See also
 List of museums in Taiwan

References

External links

  

1931 establishments in Taiwan
Art museums and galleries in Taiwan
Art museums established in 2019
Museums in Tainan
Former police stations in Taiwan